Pseudoamuria is a genus of moths of the family Zygaenidae.

Species
Pseudoamuria neglecta Tarmann, 2005
Pseudoamuria uptoni Tarmann, 2005

References

Procridinae